"I Want You to Know" is a song by German music producer Zedd, featuring vocals from American singer Selena Gomez from the former's second studio album, True Colors (2015). It was written by Zedd, OneRepublic's frontman Ryan Tedder, and KDrew. "I Want You to Know" was released on February 23, 2015 as the album's lead single and debuted on American contemporary hit radio on March 3, 2015, receiving  generally positive reviews from music critics. It has charted within the top 10 in Wallonia and Finland, as well as the top 40 in fifteen additional countries. It has been certified platinum in the United States and Sweden. It won a Latin American Music Award for Favorite Dance Song in 2015. It is also featured in the video games Guitar Hero Live, Dance Dance Revolution A and NBA 2K16.

Background
"I Want You to Know" is an EDM and electropop track written by Zedd, Ryan Tedder, and KDrew. Tedder and Zedd had previously worked together on Clarity album track "Lost at Sea". Tedder called Zedd when he had an idea of a track. Zedd and Gomez first met by accident on December 4, 2014, with Zedd stating: "Our studios are right across the street from each other, and I just went to the bathroom and ran into her at the studio." The following day, Gomez posted a picture online with Zedd although did not confirm they were working together. Describing her featuring, he said: "We recorded her vocal and I loved it, and I never tried anyone else on [the song]." Commenting on the song, Tedder said: "Zedd crushed it."

Composition
Musically, according to the sheet music published at Musicnotes.com, "I Want You to Know" is written in the key of A Minor with a tempo of 130 beats per minute. It follows a chord progression of Am-Em-F-Cadd9-C.

Critical reception
The song has received generally positive reviews. Nolan Feeney of Time applauded the collaboration between Zedd and Gomez saying they "make beautiful music together". He explained: "Zedd's futuristic synthesizers recall 'Break Free,' his literally-out-of-this-world collaboration with Ariana Grande, but Gomez [...] keeps the track from becoming a lifeless carbon copy."  Jason Lipshutz of Billboard wrote that Gomez "finally hit her mark" with the song. "Gomez has never been known as a vocal powerhouse, but she deftly handles patently overdramatic lines [...] with the proper amount of yearning and unflappability. When that first drop does arrive about 80 seconds in, Zedd provides a swiveling party scene with a whiff of Daft Punk's maximalist disco thrown in for good measure." Writing for the same publication, Dan Hyman awarded the song two stars out of a possible five, stating that it "never finds its footing, and never rises above the clichéd EDM formula it follows to a T".

Music Times praised the song: "The duo's real life chemistry is present in "I Want You to Know," with Gomez's voice weaving perfectly through the beat, and it's a wonder why she hasn't ventured much into the world of EDM before." Inquisitr called this song "underwhelming given all the hype." Idolator also wrote a mixed opinion "Zedd borrows his tried-and-true EDM formula that doesn’t bring anything new to the genre, while Gomez’s vocals churn around the rhythms like clothes on auto-spin. It is not the most exciting track, but it will have people bopping at the nightclubs."

Chart performance
Two days after its release, the song debuted at No. 6 on the US Dance/Electronic Digital Songs chart and No. 9 on the full US Dance/Electronic Songs chart. On the chart dated March 14, 2015, "I Want You to Know" debuted at number 24 on the US Mainstream Top 40 chart (the highest debut on the chart that week) and at number 22 on the US Dance/Mix Show Airplay chart. On the week of March 14, the song debuted at its peak position of number 17 on the US Billboard Hot 100. 
It also peaked at number 14 in UK Singles Chart. As of July 2015, "I Want You To Know" has sold 511,000 copies in the US. It has been certified Platinum in the United States and Sweden. It has also been certified Gold in Australia, Denmark and Italy.

Music video
The music video was released on March 10, 2015 on Vevo. It was directed by Brent Bonacorso and edited by Anthony Chirco. Zedd said: "It's gonna be a sexy 70s video with a lot of very interesting effects. Really cool." It shows, Gomez goes to a party club and dancing. Zedd appears as a hologram. The disco scenes are alternated to scenes, where Zedd and Gomez are together illuminated by strobe lights.

Awards and nominations

Formats and track listings

Credits and personnel
Selena Gomez – lead vocals, background vocals
Anton Zaslavski, Ryan Tedder, Kevin Nicholas Drew – songwriters 
Zedd – producer

Charts

Weekly charts

Year-end charts

Decade-end charts

Certifications

Release history

References

External links 
 

2015 singles
Zedd songs
Selena Gomez songs
Electronic dance music songs
Dance-pop songs
Electro house songs
Interscope Records singles
Songs written by Ryan Tedder
Songs written by Zedd
2014 songs